Manuel Esteban Paez Terán, also known as Tortuguita, was a Venezuelan environmental activist and non-binary eco-anarchist who was shot and killed by a Georgia State Patrol trooper after an altercation wounded an officer during a raid of the Stop Cop City encampment on January 18, 2023 (some believe the officer was wounded by friendly fire). The wounding initiated fire from police, killing Terán.
At the time Terán was shot the family claims their hands were up, based on their recent independent autopsy results, which showed bullet exit wounds in both hands. The claim of friendly fire is disputed by the Atlanta Police Department, who claim Terán fired without warning. 

Terán was the first environmental activist to be killed by police in United States history. Protests and vigils were held in several cities in the United States and elsewhere in reaction to the shooting, including a riot in Atlanta on January 21, 2023.  Many organizations and some members of Congress have condemned the killing and called for an independent investigation of the events.

Background 

Terán was a 26-year-old Venezuelan environmental activist and graduate of Florida State University, who had been active in several activist movements, including Food Not Bombs!, before joining the Stop Cop City movement in Atlanta. Terán went by the nickname Tortuguita, which is Spanish for "Little Turtle". 

The Stop Cop City protests that Terán was participating in were part of broader longstanding tensions over law enforcement killings in the United States following the murder of George Floyd in 2020. Stop Cop City demonstrators opposed the construction of the Atlanta Public Training Facility, which is slated for construction near and in a predominantly non-white neighborhood.

Fatal shooting 

The morning of January 18, 2023, Terán was inside a tent at the Stop Cop City encampment. At around 9:00 a.m. that morning, Georgia State Patrol troopers commenced a raid on the encampment During the raid, a state patrol trooper was struck by a bullet in the pelvic area of the body  and at around 9:04 a.m., state patrol troopers fired on Terán, killing them at the scene.

Investigations 

According to police accounts of the incident, the troopers encountered a tent and gave verbal commands for a person inside to exit; Terán did not comply and fired first without warning.  Stop Cop City activists disputed the police description of the event. Other protesters and Terán's family dispute that Terán fired a gun. The shooting was initially under investigation by the both the GBI and DeKalb County District Attorney's office. District Attorney Sherry Boston requested an independent prosecuting agency to take over the investigation to avoid the appearance of a conflict of interest as her office is involved in task force for the Atlanta Public Training Facility.

According to the Georgia Bureau of Investigation (GBI), Forensic ballistic analysis determined that the projectile recovered from the officer's wound matched the handgun found in Terán's possession. The details of the analysis have not been released publicly. The recovered handgun, a Smith & Wesson M&P Shield 9mm semi-automatic pistol, was determined to have been purchased legally by Terán in September 2020. Police said that Terán refused to obey orders to leave the tent, and subsequently shot and wounded a police officer with a gun Terán purchased in September 2020. 

According to the Georgia Bureau of Investigation, there is no body cam footage of the shooting itself. On February 9, Atlanta police released body camera footage of the aftermath of the shooting wherein an officer is heard saying, 

Two officers are later heard asking "Did they shoot their own man?" In the footage, officers were also heard saying that the gunfire "sounded like suppressed gunfire." This comment led some to believe that the officer had been injured by friendly fire rather than by Terán.

Results from an independent autopsy determined that Téran had been shot 14 times "by different firearms" with their hands raised while sitting cross-legged on the ground.

Regarding Teran's hands being raised there is no evidence that their hands were up in the air, above their head, as if they were surrendering. According to the autopsy their palms were facing themselves toward their upper body where their wounds were. The official autopsy report states that "At some point during the course of being shot, the decedent was able to raise his hands and arms up and in front of his body, with his palms facing towards his upper body." Teran's upper body is where they were hit with more than one projectile.

Reaction and unrest 

Notable vigils and protests were also held in the U.S. cities of Atlanta, Bridgeport, Minneapolis, Nashville, Philadelphia, and Tucson from January 20–22, 2023. Some demonstrators spray painted graffiti on Bank of America buildings to protest the company's involvement in financing the facility's construction. Vigils were also held in the U.S. cities of Seattle and Chicago, and internationally in London and Lützerath.

Atlanta riot 
In downtown Atlanta on January 21, 2023, protests briefly turned violent. Demonstrators had marched from Underground Atlanta down Peachtree Street. At the intersection with Ellis Street, some demonstrators threw objects, set at least two Atlanta Police Department vehicles on fire, and smashed windows of bank buildings with hammers. The events had broad participation from people across the United States. Six people — most of whom were White and from outside of the U.S. state of Georgia — were arrested and charged criminally for actions during the January 21 riot. Police alleged that several of the persons arrested possessed explosives. 

Stop Cop City issued a statement the day after the riot stating, "Destruction of material is fundamentally different from violence. All reported acts appear to be explicitly targeted against the financial backers". On January 26, 2023, Georgia governor Brian Kemp declared a state of emergency in response to unrest that had erupted following the killing.

Response 
In the aftermath of the fatal shooting, the Georgia General Assembly considered legislation to require state patrol officers to wear body cameras.

In February, three U.S. Congress members called for an independent investigation into the killing. Several hundred national and international organizations have condemned the killing and called for an independent investigation.

See also 
 2020–2023 United States racial unrest
 Lists of killings by law enforcement officers in the United States

References

Further reading 

 Donziger, Steven (February 2, 2023). "Environmentalist Manuel Esteban Paez Terán’s death is part of a disturbing trend". The Guardian. Retrieved February 3, 2023.

External links 
 Police footage from raid and subsequent events leading to the killing of Terán:
 Atlanta PD Bodycam - 1/18/23 Forest Raid (89-2.mp4)
 Atlanta PD Bodycam - 1/18/23 Forest Raid (39-3.mp4)
 Atlanta PD Bodycam - 1/18/23 Forest Raid Axon Body 3 Video (0901_X6039B6NY.mp4)
 Atlanta PD Bodycam - 1/18/23 Forest Raid Axon Body 3 Video (0845_X6039B6NY.mp4)

2023 deaths
Environmentalists
Killings by law enforcement officers in the United States
Protest-related deaths